Mathieu Coutadeur  (born 20 March 1986) is a French professional footballer who plays as a midfielder for  club Ajaccio.

Club career
Coutadeur played for his hometown club Le Mans between 2005 and 2009. He played an important role in Le Mans' 2007–08 season, helping them finish in the top half of Ligue 1. He played over 100 games for the club before changing clubs.

On 31 August 2009, Coutadeur signed a four-year contract with Monaco for €4 million.

References

External links
 
 

1986 births
Living people
Footballers from Le Mans
Association football midfielders
French footballers
France youth international footballers
France under-21 international footballers
Ligue 1 players
Championnat National 2 players
Championnat National 3 players
Cypriot First Division players
Ligue 2 players
Le Mans FC players
AS Monaco FC players
FC Lorient players
AEL Limassol players
Stade Lavallois players
AC Ajaccio players
French expatriate footballers
Expatriate footballers in Cyprus
French expatriate sportspeople in Cyprus